The Planetarium of the Royal Observatory of Belgium is a Belgian planetarium on the Heysel Plateau in Brussels and part of the institutions of the Belgian Federal Science Policy Office.

Construction
The Brussels Planetarium is one of the most important planetariums in Europe and a leading attraction in Belgium. The planetarium has an international scientific reputation, and with its dome of 23 meters in diameter, it is one of the largest in Europe. 

The dome of the planetarium measures 23 metres in diameter, on which the Sun, the Moon, the planets, the Milky Way and more than 8500 stars can be projected. The Zeiss UPP 23/5 projector of the planetarium is made up of 119 projectors and was built by the Carl Zeiss company of Jena.

See also
 Belgian Institute for Space Aeronomy
 Royal Meteorological Institute
 Observatory
 Astrarium
 Astrolabe
 Astronomical clock
 Fulldome video
 Star atlas

References

External links

 Planetarium Brussels

Planetaria in Belgium
Buildings and structures in Brussels